Officer and Laughing Girl, also known as Officer and a Laughing Girl, Officer With a Laughing Girl or De Soldaat en het Lachende Meisje, was painted by the Dutch artist Johannes Vermeer between 1655 and 1660. It was painted in oil on canvas, typical of most Dutch artists of the time, and is 50.5 by 46 cm. It is now one of three pictures by Vermeer in The Frick Collection in New York

Officer and Laughing Girl includes many of the characteristics of Vermeer's style. The main subject is a woman in a yellow dress, light is coming from the left-hand side of the painting from an open window, and there is a large map on the wall. Each of these elements occur in some of his other paintings, although this painting differs slightly with the man also sitting at the table. Art historians, who have suggested conflicting interpretations of the work, believe that a painting by Gerard van Honthorst inspired the composition and that Vermeer used a camera obscura to create the perspective in this painting.

Subject and interpretation

The main subject is the woman at the center, whose face is illuminated by soft, direct light. She resembles Vermeer's wife, Catharina Bolnes, who is believed to have posed for many of his paintings. With x-ray photographs, art historians have determined that Vermeer had originally planned to paint the woman with a large white collar, which would have hidden much of her yellow dress. Also, her cap was later extended to cover all of her hair, drawing more attention to her face and expression. This yellow bodice with braiding has appeared in many of Vermeer's other portraits; it is called a schort and was usually worn as an everyday, common dress. Over her dress the woman wears a blue apron, mostly hidden in the shadows of the table. Blue aprons were common attire at that time because they hid stains well. Art historians have interpreted this to mean that the soldier has surprised the girl with an impromptu visit during her morning chores. The woman holds a wine glass, usually used for white wine. Because at that time wine cost more than beer, it indicates her wealth.

The cavalier in the foreground wears a red coat and an expensive hat, displaying his wealth and rank. His hat is wide-brimmed and made of beaver pelt, which was weather-resistant and good for snowy and rainy conditions. The pelts for these hats were imported from the New World, in this case probably from New Netherlands, which was then under the Dutch West India Company's control. The red in his uniform is associated with power and passion, bringing a passionate and emotional note to the painting. His rank as an officer is indicated by the black sash he wears. His striking presence in the immediate foreground  drama and depth to the mood of the composition. This artistic device—in which an object is placed in the foreground to increase the depth of field of the overall painting—is called repoussoir. Caravaggio often used this technique and Vermeer probably learned it from a Caravaggist's painting.

The nature of the interaction between the woman and the soldier can only be conjectured. Many art historians believe that it only portrays a woman being innocently and honorably courted by this soldier. However, some have suggested that her open hand and smile could indicate a discreet negotiation of payment before coitus.

"The Dutch painter Johannes Vermeer of Delft (1632-1675) holds a position of great honor among map historians. Several of his painting illustrate maps hanging on walls or globes standing on tables or cabinets. Vermeer painted these cartographical documents with such detail that it is often possible to identify the actual maps. Evidently, Vermeer was particularly attached to a Willem Blaeu - Balthasar Florisz van Berckenrode map of Holland and West Friesland, as he represented it as a wall decoration in three of his paintings... Though no longer extant, the map's existence is known from archival sources and second edition published by Willem Blaeu in 1621, titled "Nova et Accurata Totius Hollandiae Westfriesiaeq. Topographia, Descriptore Balthazaro Florentio a Berke[n]rode Batavo". Vermeer must have had a copy at his disposal (or the earlier one published by Van Berckenrode). Around 1658 he showed it as a wall decoration in his painting "Officer and Laughing Girl", which depicts a soldier in a large hat sitting with his back to viewer, talking with a smiling girl who holds a glass in her hand. Bright sunlight bathes the girl and the large map on the wall. Vermeer's gift for realism is evidenced by the fact that the wall map, mounted on linen and wooden rods, is identifiable as Blaeu's 1621 map of Holland and West Friesland. He captures all of its characteristic design, decoration, and geographic content."

Window

The window and lighting is characteristic of Vermeer's interior paintings, most likely because it is modeled after the room he painted in. This window is extremely similar to the window in the Girl Reading a Letter and Open Window and the Milkmaid. The glass in the window has many variations of color, showing Vermeer's precision in the details of this painting. Only bright light comes in from the window and no outside scene can be observed, as Vermeer never allows the viewer to see the outside world.

Camera obscura
Some art historians believe that Vermeer used a device called a camera obscura to help him create the perspective in his painting. Instead of using a mathematical formula or a vanishing point, Vermeer probably used this mechanical device to show him what the relative size of the people should be. A camera obscura is similar to a camera as it projects an image seen through the aperture into a dark chamber. There is no historical evidence that Vermeer used such a device but the way he portrays perspective in many of his paintings, including Officer and Laughing Girl, suggests that he did.

Painting materials
The older pigment analysis by W. Kuhn and also the more recent data collection revealed the use of the typical pigments of the Baroque period: ochres, lead-tin-yellow, natural ultramarine, and azurite.

See also
 List of paintings by Johannes Vermeer
 Dutch Golden Age painting

References

Further reading

The Essential Vermeer Website http://www.essentialvermeer.com/catalogue/officer_and_laughing_girl.html
Koning, Hans, and the Editors of Time- Life Books. The World of Vermeer: 1632–1675
Nash, J. M. The Age of Rembrandt and Vermeer

External links
The Milkmaid by Johannes Vermeer, exhibition catalog fully online as PDF from The Metropolitan Museum of Art, which contains material on this painting
http://www.essentialvermeer.com/catalogue/officer_and_laughing_girl.html
Johannes Vermeer, Officer and Laughing Girl, ColourLex
 Officer and Laughing Girl at the website of The Frick Collection
 Online lecture by Aimee Ng, in the Cocktails with a Curator series, released 17 July 2020

Genre paintings by Johannes Vermeer
1650s paintings
Paintings in the Frick Collection
Maps in art
Cartography in the Dutch Republic
Early modern Netherlandish cartography